The B.F. Good & Company Leaf Tobacco Warehouse, also known as the P. Lorillard Company Tobacco Warehouse, is an historic tobacco warehouse which is located in Lancaster, Lancaster County, Pennsylvania. 

It was listed on the National Register of Historic Places in 1985.

History and architectural features
Built between 1899 and 1900, this historic warehouse is a three-and-one-half-story, rectangular, brick building that was designed in the Beaux-Arts style. It sits on a high foundation of gray limestone. 

The Lorillard Tobacco Company purchased the building in 1920.

It was listed on the National Register of Historic Places in 1985.

The building is now home to RGS Associates and the Lancaster office of BrandYourself.

References

Industrial buildings and structures on the National Register of Historic Places in Pennsylvania
Beaux-Arts architecture in Pennsylvania
Industrial buildings completed in 1900
Buildings and structures in Lancaster, Pennsylvania
Lorillard Tobacco Company
Tobacco buildings in the United States
National Register of Historic Places in Lancaster, Pennsylvania
1900 establishments in Pennsylvania